Jēkabs Nākums (born 4 February 1972) is a Latvian biathlete. He competed at the 1998 Winter Olympics and the 2002 Winter Olympics.

References

1972 births
Living people
Latvian male biathletes
Olympic biathletes of Latvia
Biathletes at the 1998 Winter Olympics
Biathletes at the 2002 Winter Olympics
People from Priekule Municipality